Bandari is a feminine given name and a surname. People with the name include:

Given name
 Al Bandari Mobarak (born 2001), Saudi Arabian footballer
 Al Bandari bint Abdulaziz Al Saud (1928–2008), member of the Saudi royal family
 Al Bandari bint Abdul Rahman Al Saud (died 2019), member of the Saudi royal family

Surname
 Jagadeesh Prathap Bandari (born 1993), Indian actor
 Jayamma Bandari (born c. 1978), Indian activist

Arabic feminine given names
Indian surnames